Loveline is a syndicated radio call-in program in North America, offering medical and relationship advice to listeners, often with the assistance of guests, typically actors and musicians. Its host through most of its run was Dr. Drew Pinsky who was paired with a radio personality.

Loveline was broadcast live, Sundays through Thursdays at 10pm–midnight PT (Mondays through Fridays at 1am–3am ET). Its flagship station was KROQ-FM in Los Angeles. Syndication was usually on rock, alternative, and adult talk radio stations. Loveline can also be heard online anywhere in the world, by streaming through the websites of affiliate stations.

The radio show was discontinued in April 2016. After a hiatus, the show was rebooted as a podcast with Amber Rose and clinical psychologist and sex therapist, Chris Donaghue, as hosts. The renewed podcast ran from September 8, 2016, until March 17, 2018.

On November 1, 2018, Loveline was revived on LGBTQ network Channel Q with Dr. Chris Donaghue as the solo host, heard Monday through Thursday from 7 to 9 p.m. Eastern Time. Channel Q is owned by Audacy, Inc. and heard on the company's namesake streaming service and on the HD Radio subchannels of about 20 FM stations in New York City, Los Angeles, Chicago and other large media markets.

During its peak of popularity, Loveline also doubled as a weekly live audience television program on MTV, also called Loveline. It was presented by Pinsky, Adam Carolla and a third co-host.

History 

Loveline began in 1983 as a Sunday night dating and relationships segment on Los Angeles radio station KROQ-FM, hosted by DJ Jim "Poorman" Trenton, DJ "Swedish" Egil Aalvik, and Scott Mason.

In 1984, Trenton added a segment called "Ask a Surgeon," hosted by his friend Drew Pinsky, who at the time, was a fourth-year medical student at the University of Southern California. The medical segment was pre-dated by an occasional legal segment in which a lawyer, known as "Lawyer Lee" would be present to answer legal questions. As Loveline developed and increased its audience, Pinsky became a public figure in his own right, and the show began referring to him informally as "Dr. Drew".

After a traumatic break up, Mason announced that he would no longer be hosting the show. After they stopped doing the "Lawyer Lee" segment and "Swedish" Egil left the show, Trenton continued co-hosting the show with Dr. Drew. In February 1992, the show expanded from Sunday nights to five nights a week, Sunday through Thursday. In August 1993 Trenton was replaced by former MTV VJ Riki Rachtman.

Pinsky and Rachtman were joined by Adam Carolla in October 1995, as the show was first being syndicated nationally. The trio hosted together for several months, but Carolla and Rachtman often competed for airtime, leading Rachtman to resign in January 1996. Carolla and Pinsky would go on to host the show together until Carolla's departure in November 2005.

The popularity and reach of Loveline increased dramatically in the ten years during which it was hosted by Pinsky and Carolla. The two had a natural chemistry, in which Carolla's jocular tone emphasized Pinsky's reasoned expertise. Together, they refined the format of the show, and capitalized on their growing popularity with speaking tours, a television show on MTV from 1996–2000 (also titled Loveline), a book, and cameo appearances on television series and movies. In November 2005, Carolla left Loveline to prepare for a new morning radio show, The Adam Carolla Show, which began airing in January 2006.

After Carolla's departure, he was substituted on a temporary basis by numerous celebrity guests, some of whom announced their desire to take the job permanently. During his first appearance on Carolla's new morning show, Pinsky revealed that the shortlist of candidates included Carson Daly, Joel McHale, Danny Bonaduce, Steve-O and Daniel Tosh. On July 23, 2006, KROQ-FM disc jockey Stryker was hired as Pinsky's co-host.

On April 22, 2009, Stryker announced that due to financial cutbacks at Westwood One, he would be leaving the show and it would be his last appearance that night. After Stryker's departure, a number of celebrities guest co-hosted opposite Drew. On March 11, 2010, it was announced that Mike "Psycho Mike" Catherwood from The Kevin and Bean Show would co-host Loveline with Dr. Drew.

After a long stint as a guest host, Simone Bienne was formally brought on as a co-host in December 2011. This followed Westwood One's merger with Dial Global. She was introduced to the show by Dr. Drew through Lifechangers, and is the first female co-host of the radio show. As of November 2012 she is no longer a host.

On December 7, 2012, Adam Carolla rejoined Dr. Drew for a Loveline-style "Reunion Tour" of the US to promote their new podcast, The Adam & Dr. Drew Show.

On January 5, 2015, Catherwood and Pinsky launched a new program, Dr. Drew Midday Live with Mike Catherwood on KABC in Los Angeles.

On March 16, 2016, Catherwood announced that he would be leaving the show to focus more on raising his daughter. His final episode was March 31, 2016. A month later, on April 21, Dr. Drew announced Loveline would wrap up the following week, after the April 28 episode. Adam Carolla re-joined him as co-host for the final show.

On September 8, 2016, the show was rebooted as a weekly podcast, with Amber Rose and Dr. Chris Donaghue serving as hosts. Ann Ingold was named producer. The final episode of the podcast was released on March 8, 2018.

On November 1, 2018, Loveline was once again rebooted, this time on LGBTQ+ formatted talk radio network Channel Q. It is hosted by Dr. Chris Donaghue, and airs Monday through Thursday from 7PM to 9PM (Pacific).

Format 
Loveline follows the call-in question-and-answer model with the primary goal of helping youth and young adults with relationship, sexuality, and drug addiction problems through the expertise of Pinsky, an internist and addiction medicine specialist, and the humorous context and insight provided by a comedic host. Adam Carolla explained his role as a "sheep in wolf's clothing". Furthermore, the comedy is often necessary to keep spirits high, as the show frequently handles callers who are dealing with serious issues such as drug addiction, sexual abuse, and domestic violence.

The show will occasionally answer calls of a general medical nature, especially on slow nights or if they seem peculiar. Also, listeners are encouraged to participate in Loveline's many games.

Personalities

Regular hosts 
 Drew Pinsky (December 1984 – April 28, 2016)
 Jim "The Poorman" Trenton (1983 – August 1993)
 "Swedish" Egil Aalvik (1983–1990)
 Scott Mason (1983–1987)
 Attorney Lee "Harvey" Alpert (1986–1989)
 Riki Rachtman (August 1993 – January 17, 1996)
 Adam Carolla (October 1995 – November 3, 2005)
 Stryker (July 23, 2006 – April 22, 2009)
 Michael Catherwood (March 21, 2010 – March 31, 2016)
 Simone Bienne (December 6, 2011 – November 11, 2012)
 Amber Rose (September 8, 2016 – March 17, 2018)
 Chris Donaghue (September 8, 2016 – March 17, 2018)

Recurring fill-ins 
For Pinsky (in the case of medical physicians) or Psycho Mike (in the case of usual comedic co-host)
 Dr. Gary Alter: "Dr. Alter" ("Dr. Whack 'n' Sack, Dr. Alter-men")
 Nicole Alvarez: DJ on KROQ-FM
 David Alan Grier: a popular and frequent guest, sometimes referred to as the "Third Host" of Loveline or DAG.
 Dr. Ohad Ben-Yehuda: "Dr. Ben" (OB/GYN, Infertility, High Risk Obstetrics)
 Dr. Marcel Daniels: "Dr. Marcel"
 Dr. Bruce Heischober: "Dr. Bruce" (Ichabod Bruce, Dr. Spaz)
 Dr. Bruce Hensel: "Dr. Bruce"
 Dr. Reef Karim: "Dr. Reef"
 Dr. Robert Rey: "Dr. 90210", a plastic surgeon from Beverly Hills
 Trina Dolenz: former host of VH1's Tool Academy and couples therapist
 Emily Morse: "Sex with Emily"

Producers 
 Ann Wilkins-Ingold (1988 – April 28, 2016)
 Lauren (Junior Producer) (2002 – December 20, 2007)

Radio engineers 
The show has had many engineers throughout the years who have developed their own on-air presence. Whether it be conversations with hosts and guests or specific "radio drops" that they have produced usually from clips of previous shows.
 Mike Dooley (October 1995 – June 20, 1999) ("Dooley," "The One-Nut Wonder," produced "The Drew Shuffle" and "The Drew Boogie")
 Anderson Cowan (June 21, 1999 – April 28, 2016) ("The Magic Fingered One," "The Liberace of the Potentiometers," produced "Millionaire", PAB, Co-Host of "The After Disaster")
 Damion Stephens (2000–2002)
 Chris Perez (2003–2005)
 Michelle (2004 – November 2005) (left for The Adam Carolla Show)

Timeline

Media tie-ins and cultural influence 
A TV version of Loveline, also called Loveline, ran on MTV from 1996 to 2000; it was produced by Stone Stanley Entertainment. It followed the same general format as the radio program but featured a live audience and a female co-host alongside Pinsky and Carolla. The female co-host role was filled over the course of the series by MTV VJ Idalis, actresses Kris McGaha, Catherine McCord, Diane Farr and comedian Laura Kightlinger. Loveline TV was filmed at Hollywood Center Studios.

The Dr. Drew and Adam Book: A Survival Guide to Life and Love, an advice book written in a tone similar to the radio show, was released in 1998.

The series has also spawned a number of Loveline-inspired games that have been mentioned on the show.

A thinly-veiled reference to Loveline can be seen in the 1988 film Heathers in a scene featuring a radio call-in advice program called Hot Probs hosted by none other than Jim Trenton, the then-host of Loveline.

See also 
 Love Phones

References

External links 

 

 
American radio programs
Comedy and humor podcasts
Interview podcasts
1983 radio programme debuts
English-language radio programs
Audio podcasts
2016 podcast debuts
2018 podcast endings
KROQ-FM